"Young" is the debut single of the Danish trio Place on Earth, winners of the eleventh season of the Danish version of X Factor. The English language song was their winner's song for the finale of the show on 6 April 2018.

Charts

References

Danish reality television series
2018 debut singles
2018 songs
Sony Music singles